Glebe Point Road is the main road of the inner city suburb of Glebe in Sydney, New South Wales, Australia. It is a boutique shopping strip with numerous restaurants and cafés.

Description and history
 
Glebe Point Road's southern end begins at the northeastern tip of Victoria Park, where Broadway becomes Parramatta Road. This area is frequented by a mix of students from the University of Sydney and University of Technology as well as residents of nearby suburbs: Darlington, Ultimo, Chippendale, and Haymarket (also known as Chinatown). Glebe Point Road extends north through Glebe, terminating at Bicentennial Park located on Rozelle Bay.

The street is lined with terrace houses and is one of the most historic streets in Sydney, dating from the early days of settlement, when the area was granted to the Anglican Church. St John's Church was built on the corner of Glebe Point Road and St Johns Road, after a design by Edmund Blacket. Built from 1868–1870, the church is listed on the (now defunct) Register of the National Estate. Blacket also built his own family home, the heritage-listed Bidura, on Glebe Point Road in 1858.

This street is the main entry point to the Glebe Estate which was originally owned by the Anglican Church and which was taken over by the Whitlam Government in 1973 for an urban renovation program.
The start of Glebe Point Road has trendy cafés and restaurants. Further down the road are very fashionable and expensive terrace houses with city and harbour views that go for over a kilometre to the water's edge.  In the past thirty years the area has become gentrified, resulting in rising property and rental prices. This has led to an increase in white-collar workers and a decrease in students, artists, writers and musicians. Professionals, administrative and sales staff make up 44 per cent of all residents, which is above the city average of 30 per cent.

There is student accommodation at the heritage-listed University Hall and Cottages, located on the junction of Glebe Point Road, Broadway and Parramatta Road. The cottages date from 1837 and the hall, originally the University Hotel, was built between 1889 and 1890.

There was an active tramway on Glebe Point Road between 1892 and 1958 until the trams were replaced by buses. Roadworks near the Bridge Road cross in late 2009 uncovered a section of the original tram tracks. The City of Sydney have left these exposed to serve as a historical reminder. Today Transdev John Holland route 370 and Transit Systems routes 431 and 433 traverse Glebe Point Road.

Points of interest
 Gleebooks, an independent bookstore that has been operating on Glebe Point Road since 1975 and has been in its current location since 1990

See also

References

External links
 GlebeNet: Information for Residents and Tourists 
  [CC-By-SA] 
  [CC-By-SA] 

Streets in Sydney
Glebe, New South Wales